Camille Agnes Becker Paul (1932-2010) was an Australian feminist, moral theologian and activist.

Early life 
Camille Agnes Becker was born in Sydney, Australia, in 1932. Her father, Norman Becker, was an engineer who worked on the New South Wales railroad, and her mother, Elsie Childs, was a dressmaker. She was raised in a Catholic family and attended Catholic school for primary education. and later studied to be a secretary, and a physical education trainer. She married Ken Paul in 1956, and had six children with him. Tragically, one of their children, a son, died by drowning in 1972, and one daughter was stillborn.  These tragedies caused Paul to question her religious faith.

Career 
Paul became interested in counseling, and attended the Roman Catholic Archdiocese of Sydney's Institute of Counseling, from 1975 to 1977. She then attended St. Patrick's Seminary in Manly. She became the second laywoman to obtain a baccalaureate degree in Sacred Theology from the seminary, when she graduated in 1983. She then earned a graduate degree in religious studies from the Catholic College of Education, in Sydney.

In 1984, she helped found Women and the Australian Church (WATAC),  along with Pauline Smith and Patricia Bartley.  She co-edited the journal Women-Church: An Australian Journal of Feminist Studies in Religion, from 1989 to 2007.

Paul became a moral theology lecturer at St. Patrick's Seminary in 1985.  She taught with Father Thomas Connelly in her first year, and in 1986, she began teaching the course on her own. She was the first woman to teach theology at the seminary.  During her career, she also taught at the Catholic Institute of Sydney, and other regional settings.

In 1993, she earned a PhD from the University of Sydney.  She published Equal or Different? Women, the Papacy and Social Justice, based on her dissertation, in 1999.

Death 
She died in 2010, from colon cancer.

References 

Australian feminists
1932 births
2010 deaths
People from Sydney
Australian Catholic University alumni
Australian magazine editors
University of Sydney alumni
Australian theologians